Alexey Vishnitsky (1 May 1981, in Kharkiv) honoured master of sports, champion of Europe, record holder of Europe, 2 times IPF (International Powerlifting Federation) powerlifting world champion, member of the team of strongmen of Ukraine. Multiple winner in the team among 105 kg. Took part in the TV show Fort Boyard (TV series) in 2004 with Vasiliy Verastuks's team of strongmen.

Biography 
Alexey was born on 1 May 1981 in Kharkiv, Ukraine. His mother was a kindergarten teacher, and his father a welder. His older brother works in the Kharkiv Fire Lifeguard Department of the Ministry of Emergencies. He has two children, a daughter, Kseniya, and a son, Arsenij.

In 1998 Vishnitsky finished secondary school at Number 120 in Kharkiv. In 1998 he entered the Academy of Physical Culture and Sport in Kharkiv and graduated with a master's degree in 2004. He then entered Kharkiv State Veterinary Academy and graduated in 2009 with a speciality as a  pharmacist of veterinary medicine. Since 2002 he has worked as an individual instructor in the fitness center.

Progress 
2000 — 2nd place on European Junior Powerlifting Championship.
2001 — champion & record-breaker of Ukraine.
2001 — champion & record-breaker of Europe. Russia, Syktyvkar.
2001 — Alexey Vishnitsky win  IPF World men's open World Single Championships 15.11.2001 Sotkamo - Finland. 
2001, 2002, 2003 - get title - The Best Kharkiv Sportsman of Non Olympic sports.
2002 — 3rd place on European Powerlifting Championship. Sweden.
2002 — 3rd place on *32nd Mens open World Single Championships Trencin Slovakia 13 to 17 November 2002
2002, 2003 - get title - Young Person of the Year in Kharkiv in sport category.
2003 — Alexey win Ukrainian Powerlifting Championship.
2003 — Alexey Vishnitsky win  Open Men's World Championships, Denmark, Vejle, 04-09.11.2003
2003 — get title - The Best Sportsman in Ukraine in Powerlifting & Best Sportsman in Ukraine of Non Olympic sports.

Since 2003 and up to today – member of the U.F.S.A. Strongmen tournament;
2010 - the winner in the content of the team among 105 kg strongmen Ukraine - Europe ;
2011 – the winner in the content of the team of strongmen Ukraine - United States.

Options

Records 
2001 year — European record — dead Lift — 375 kg.
2003 year — European record — squat — 387 kg. Summary record — 982 kg.

Honours

Videos 
 Vysnitsky Alexey on YouTube

See also 
 Powerlifting
 Bench press
 Squat (exercise)
 Deadlift
 Strongman Champions League
 IFSA
 U.F.S.A.
 Vasyl Virastyuk
 Serhiy Romanchuk

External links 
 Federation of the Strongest Athletes of Ukraine
 Professional League Strongmens Ukraine
 Kharkiv Powerlifting Federation
 inKharkov
 Powerlifting in Russia
 Europenan IPF Powerlifting Championship 2002 View 
 Official IPF web site

Living people
1981 births
Sportspeople from Kharkiv
Ukrainian male weightlifters
Ukrainian strength athletes
Ukrainian powerlifters